Ana María Morgade Pérez (Madrid, 8 November 1979) is a Spanish presenter, comedian and actress. From September 2009 to June 2011, she was part of the regular cast of the Spanish late show Buenafuente, broadcast on La Sexta. In November 2013, she joined as collaborator in the comedy TV program Zapeando.

Biography
She was born in Madrid in 1979. She graduated in Audiovisual Communication from the Complutense University of Madrid. She was trained as an actress in the school of Cristina Rota.

Her television debut came in March 2007, in the comedy program Esta tarde con esta gente, on channel Cuatro, that was canceled after two emissions. Later, in summer 2008, she participated in the program Con un par... de bromas, on Televisión Española, hosted by Javier Capitan.

In September 2008, she returned to television channel Cuatro, where she presented alongside comedian Quequé the satirical news program Estas no son las noticias. The program lasted for 108 issues, until May 2009. In May 2009, she became one of the protagonists of the TV series Bicho malo in Neox for several episodes playing the role of Cecilia.

In September 2009, she joined as a comedian in the program Buenafuente in La Sexta.

In 2013, Ana Morgade joined the third season of the series Con el culo al aire in channel Antena 3 At the end of 2013, she also joined as collaborator in comedy program Zapeando in La Sexta channel where she still currently (20169) works. In 2015, she became one of the contestants of talent show Tu cara me suena. 
In 2016 she became the host of stand up comedy program El club de la comedia in La Sexta. In 2018 she played a role in the comedy series Cuerpo de élite.

Filmography

Television

Stage

References

External links

1979 births
Living people
People from Madrid
Spanish women comedians
Spanish stage actresses
Spanish television actresses
Spanish television presenters
Spanish women television presenters
Spanish stand-up comedians
21st-century Spanish actresses